Shacharit  ( šaḥăriṯ), or Shacharis in Ashkenazi Hebrew, is the morning tefillah (prayer) of Judaism, one of the three daily prayers.

Different traditions identify different primary components of Shacharit. Essentially all agree that pesukei dezimra, the Shema Yisrael and its blessings, and the Amidah are major sections. Some identify the preliminary blessings and readings, as a first, distinct section. Others say that Tachanun is a separate section, as well as the concluding blessings. On certain days, there are additional prayers and services added to shacharit, including Mussaf and a Torah reading.

Etymology 
Shacharit comes from the Hebrew root  (shaħar), meaning dawn.

Origin
According to tradition, Shacharit was identified as a time of prayer by Abraham, as  states, "Abraham arose early in the morning," which traditionally is the first Shacharit. However, Abraham's prayer did not become a standardized prayer.

Shacharit was also instituted in part as a replacement of the daily morning Temple service after the destruction of the Temple. The sages of the Great Assembly may have formulated blessings and prayers that later became part of Shacharit, however the siddur, or prayerbook as we know it, was not fully formed until around the 7th century CE. The prayers said still vary among congregations and Jewish communities.

Service

Weekdays
During or before Shacharit, Jews put on their tefillin and/or tallit, according to their tradition. Both actions are accompanied by blessings. Some do not eat until they have prayed.

Traditionally, a series of introductory prayers are said as the start of Shacharit. The main pieces of these prayers are pesukei dezimra, consisting of numerous psalms, hymns, and prayers. Pesukei dezimra is said so that an individual will have praised God before making requests, which might be considered rude.

The Shema Yisrael and its related blessings are said. One should "concentrate on fulfilling the positive commandment of reciting the Shema" before reciting it. One should be sure to say it clearly and not to slur words together.

Shemoneh Esrei (The Amidah), a series of 19 blessings is recited. On Shabbat and Yom Tov, only 7 blessings are said. The blessings cover a variety of issues and ethics such as Jerusalem, crops, and prayer.

Tachanun, a supplication consisting of a collection of passages from the Hebrew bible (Tanakh) is said. On Mondays and Thursdays, a longer version is recited. On other days, the extra parts are omitted. The main part of Tachanun is traditionally said with one's head resting on his or her arm.

On certain days, there is a Torah reading at this point in the service. On most weekdays, three aliyot are given as honors; on Rosh Chodesh and Chol hamoed there are four aliyot.

The service concludes with the recitation of more verses and Aleinu.

Shabbat
The service commences as on week-days. In pesukei dezimra, most communities omit Psalm 100 (Mizmor LeTodah, the psalm for the Thanksgiving offering), because the todah or Thanksgiving offering could not be offered on Shabbat in the days of the Temple in Jerusalem. Sephardic Jews maintain a different order, add several psalms and two religious poems. The Nishmat prayer is recited at the end of the Pesukei D'Zimrah. The blessings before Shema are expanded, and include the hymn El Adon, which is often sung communally.

The intermediary blessing of the Shacharit Amidah begins with Yismach Moshe and discusses Moses' receiving of the Torah (which according to tradition took place on Shabbat morning). In Nusach Ashkenaz (and Nusach Sefard) the Kedushah, which is always recited during the Hazzan's repetition of the third blessing, is significantly expanded; in the Sephardic rite, it is recited in the same form as on weekdays. After the repetition is concluded, some recite the Psalm of the Day (others recite it at the end of the service) and the Torah scroll is taken out of the Ark.  In the Eastern Ashkenazic rite, this ritual is much longer than the ritual during the week, but in the Western Ashkenazic rite, the ritual is almost identical to that of the weekdays. The weekly portion is read, divided into at least seven Aliyot (plus a "maftir" Aliyah), followed by the haftarah.

In Nusach Ashkenaz (and Nusach Sefard), three prayers for the community are recited after the Torah reading. Two prayers starting with Yekum Purkan, composed in Babylon in Aramaic, are similar to the subsequent Mi sheberakh, a blessing for the leaders and patrons of the synagogue.  In the Western Ashkenazic rite, the Mi sheberakh is omitted on Shabbat mevorchim (Shabbat before Rosh Chodesh).

In some communities, prayers are then recited for the government of the country, for peace, and/or for the State of Israel. On the Shabbat before Rosh Chodesh (Shabbat mevorchim) a special prayer blessing the new month is recited.

After these prayers, Ashrei is repeated and the Torah scroll is returned to the Ark in a procession through the Synagogue. Many congregations allow children to come to the front in order to kiss the scroll as it passes.  This is followed by the Mussaf service.

The service concludes with Ein Keloheinu, Pitum Haketoret and Aleinu. Those who didn't recite it earlier recite the Psalm of the Day here, many Ashkenazic communities recite Anim Zemirot (either before or after the Psalm of the Day), and many conclude the services with Adon Olam.

Timing

According to Jewish law, the earliest time to recite the morning service is when there is enough natural light "one can see a familiar acquaintance six feet away." It is a subjective standard. The usual time for this prayer service is between sunrise and a third of the day. If one missed a third of the day, it may be recited until astronomical noon, referred to as chatzot. After that (technically, half an hour after chatzot), the afternoon service (mincha) can be recited.

See also
 Mandaean prayer at dawn
 Fajr
 List of Jewish prayers and blessings
 Suhur

References

External links